The Miracle of Kathy Miller is a 1981 American made-for-television drama film based on the real-life story of a Scottsdale, Arizona teenager who was critically injured in a 1977 car accident. Helen Hunt, in an early starring role, plays the title part; Frank Converse and Sharon Gless are cast as Kathy's parents.  Kathy, a high school track and field athlete, overcame the severe mental and physical injury to compete in and finish a long-distance race (shown at the climax of the film). The distributor was Universal TV.

Primary cast

 Helen Hunt : Kathy Miller
 Frank Converse : Larry Miller
 Sharon Gless : Barbara Miller
 Bill Beyers : Larry Don Miller
 John de Lancie : Dr. Christiansen
 Michele Greene : Sherrie 
 Rance Howard : Dr. Jewell
 Julie Piekarski : Carol

References
The Miracle of Kathy Miller at the Internet Movie Database

American films based on actual events
1981 television films
1981 films
American drama television films
1980s English-language films
Films directed by Robert Michael Lewis